Bert Askson (born December 16, 1945) is a former tight end and defensive end in the National Football League (NFL) who played for the Pittsburgh Steelers, New Orleans Saints, and the Green Bay Packers.  Askson was drafted by the Pittsburgh Steelers in the 14th round of the 1970 NFL Draft as the 340th overall pick.  Askson played professional football from 1971 to 1977, most notably with the Green Bay Packers from 1975 to 1977, playing in 42 games over 3 seasons.

References

1945 births
Living people
American football tight ends
Green Bay Packers players
Pittsburgh Steelers players
Texas Southern Tigers football players
New Orleans Saints players